Francis Barrell (c. 1627 – 10 September 1679) was an English lawyer and politician who sat in the House of Commons in 1679.

Barrell was the son of a Kentish clergyman and became serjeant at law at Rochester. He was elected Member of Parliament (MP) for Rochester on 16 August 1679 and held the seat until his death later in the year.

Barrell was buried in Rochester Cathedral where a monument was erected for him and his wife.

Barrell married Anne Somer, daughter of Richard Somer of Clifford's Inn. Anne died in 1707. Their son Francis was also MP for Rochester.

His grave records his wives as Ann Pearse, daughter of Thomas Pearse and Frances Bowdler, daughter of Thomas Bowdler and lastly Frances Hanbury, daughter of William Hanbury of Herefordshire.

References

English MPs 1679
1620s births
1679 deaths